In game theory, a cooperative game (or coalitional game) is a game with competition between groups of players ("coalitions") due to the possibility of external enforcement of cooperative behavior (e.g. through contract law). Those are opposed to non-cooperative games in which there is either no possibility to forge alliances or all agreements need to be self-enforcing (e.g. through credible threats).

Cooperative games are often analysed through the framework of cooperative game theory, which focuses on predicting which coalitions will form, the joint actions that groups take and the resulting collective payoffs. It is opposed to the traditional non-cooperative game theory which focuses on predicting individual players' actions and payoffs and analyzing Nash equilibria.

Cooperative game theory provides a high-level approach as it only describes the structure, strategies and payoffs of coalitions, whereas non-cooperative game theory also looks at how bargaining procedures will affect the distribution of payoffs within each coalition. As non-cooperative game theory is more general, cooperative games can be analyzed through the approach of non-cooperative game theory (the converse does not hold) provided that sufficient assumptions are made to encompass all the possible strategies available to players due to the possibility of external enforcement of cooperation. While it would thus be possible to have all games expressed under a non-cooperative framework, in many instances insufficient information is available to accurately model the formal procedures available to the players during the strategic bargaining process, or the resulting model would be of too high complexity to offer a practical tool in the real world. In such cases, cooperative game theory provides a simplified approach that allows the analysis of the game at large without having to make any assumption about bargaining powers.

Mathematical definition 

A cooperative game is given by specifying a value for every coalition. Formally, the coalitional game consists of a finite set of players , called the grand coalition, and a characteristic function   from the set of all possible coalitions of players to a set of payments that satisfies . The function describes how much collective payoff a set of players can gain by forming a coalition, and the game is sometimes called a value game or a profit game.

Conversely, a cooperative game can also be defined with a characteristic cost function  satisfying . In this setting, players must accomplish some task, and the characteristic function  represents the cost of a set of players accomplishing the task together. A game of this kind is known as a cost game. Although most cooperative game theory deals with profit games, all concepts can easily be translated to the cost setting.

Cooperative game theory definition 
Cooperative game is a mandatory binding contract that can be reached by all parties on the basis of information exchange. Moreover, cooperative game is a mechanism to establish cooperative consciousness, mutual trust, restraint and commitment through negotiation and communication. 

There are four main points: 

1. Common interests 

2. Necessary information exchange

3. Voluntariness, equality and mutual benefit 

4. Compulsory contract

Harsanyi dividend 

The Harsanyi dividend (named after John Harsanyi, who used it to generalize the Shapley value in 1963) identifies the surplus that is created by a coalition of players in a cooperative game. To specify this surplus, the worth of this coalition is corrected by the surplus that is already created by subcoalitions. To this end, the dividend  of coalition  in game  is recursively determined by

Harsanyi dividends are useful for analyzing both games and solution concepts, e.g. the Shapley value is obtained by distributing the dividend of each coalition among its members, i.e., the Shapley value  of player  in game  is given by summing up a player's share of the dividends of all coalitions that she belongs to, .

Duality 

Let  be a profit game.

 

Intuitively, the dual game represents the opportunity cost for a coalition  of not joining the grand coalition . A dual profit game  can be defined identically for a cost game . A cooperative game and its dual are in some sense equivalent, and they share many properties. For example, the core of a game and its dual are equal. For more details on cooperative game duality, see for instance .

Subgames 

Let  be a non-empty coalition of players.

 

Subgames are useful because they allow us to apply solution concepts defined for the grand coalition on smaller coalitions.

Properties for characterization

Superadditivity 
Characteristic functions are often assumed to be superadditive . This means that the value of a union of disjoint coalitions is no less than the sum of the coalitions' separate values:

 whenever  satisfy .

Monotonicity 
Larger coalitions gain more:

.

This follows from superadditivity. i.e. if payoffs are normalized so singleton coalitions have zero value.

Properties for simple games 
A coalitional game  is considered simple if payoffs are either 1 or 0, i.e. coalitions are either "winning" or "losing".

It is sometimes assumed that a simple game is nonempty or that it does not contain an empty set. However, in other areas of mathematics, simple games are also called hypergraphs or Boolean functions (logic functions).

 A simple game  is monotonic if any coalition containing a winning coalition is also winning, that is, if  and  imply .
 A simple game  is proper if the complement (opposition) of any winning coalition is losing, that is, if  implies .
 A simple game  is strong if the complement of any losing coalition is winning, that is, if  implies .
 If a simple game  is proper and strong, then  a coalition is winning if and only if its complement is losing, that is,  iff  . (If  is a coalitional simple game that is proper and strong,  for any .)
 A veto player (vetoer) in a simple game is a player that belongs to all winning coalitions. Supposing there is a veto player, any coalition not containing a veto player is losing.  A simple game  is weak (collegial) if it has a veto player, that is, if the intersection  of all winning coalitions is nonempty.
 A dictator in a simple game is a veto player such that any coalition containing this player is winning.  The dictator does not belong to any losing coalition. (Dictator games in experimental economics are unrelated to this.)
 A carrier  of a simple game  is a set  such that for any coalition , we have  iff .  When a simple game has a carrier, any player not belonging to it is ignored.  A simple game is sometimes called finite if it has a finite carrier (even if  is infinite).
 The Nakamura number of a simple game is the minimal number of winning coalitions with empty intersection.  According to Nakamura's theorem, the number measures the degree of rationality; it is an indicator of the extent to which an aggregation rule can yield well-defined choices.

A few relations among the above axioms have widely been recognized, such as the following
(e.g., Peleg, 2002, Section 2.1):

 If a simple game is weak, it is proper.
 A simple game is dictatorial if and only if it is strong and weak.

More generally, a complete investigation of the relation among the four conventional axioms
(monotonicity, properness, strongness, and non-weakness), finiteness, and algorithmic computability
has been made (Kumabe and Mihara, 2011),
whose results are summarized in the Table "Existence of Simple Games" below.

The restrictions that various axioms for simple games impose on their Nakamura number were also studied extensively.
In particular, a computable simple game without a veto player has a Nakamura number greater than 3 only if it is a proper and non-strong game.

Relation with non-cooperative theory 

Let G be a strategic (non-cooperative) game. Then, assuming that coalitions have the ability to enforce coordinated behaviour, there are several cooperative games associated with G. These games are often referred to as representations of G. The two standard representations are:

 The α-effective game associates with each coalition the sum of gains its members can 'guarantee' by joining forces. By 'guaranteeing', it is meant that the value is the max-min, e.g. the maximal value of the minimum taken over the opposition's strategies.
 The β-effective game associates with each coalition the sum of gains its members can 'strategically guarantee' by joining forces. By 'strategically guaranteeing', it is meant that the value is the min-max, e.g. the minimal value of the maximum taken over the opposition's strategies.

Solution concepts 

The main assumption in cooperative game theory is that the grand coalition  will form. The challenge is then to allocate the payoff  among the players in some fair way. (This assumption is not restrictive, because even if players split off and form smaller coalitions, we can apply solution concepts to the subgames defined by whatever coalitions actually form.)  A solution concept is a vector  (or a set of vectors) that represents the allocation to each player. Researchers have proposed different solution concepts based on different notions of fairness. Some properties to look for in a solution concept include:

 Efficiency: The payoff vector exactly splits the total value: .
 Individual rationality: No player receives less than what he could get on his own: .
 Existence: The solution concept exists for any game .
 Uniqueness: The solution concept is unique for any game .
 Computational ease: The solution concept can be calculated efficiently (i.e. in polynomial time with respect to the number of players .)
 Symmetry: The solution concept  allocates equal payments  to symmetric players , . Two players ,  are symmetric if ; that is, we can exchange one player for the other in any coalition that contains only one of the players and not change the payoff.
 Additivity: The allocation to a player in a sum of two games is the sum of the allocations to the player in each individual game.
 Zero Allocation to Null Players: The allocation to a null player is zero. A null player  satisfies . In economic terms, a null player's marginal value to any coalition that does not contain him is zero.

An efficient payoff vector is called a pre-imputation, and an individually rational pre-imputation is called an imputation. Most solution concepts are imputations.

The stable set of a game (also known as the von Neumann-Morgenstern solution ) was the first solution proposed for games with more than 2 players.

A stable set is a set of imputations that satisfies two properties:

 Internal stability: No payoff vector in the stable set is dominated by another vector in the set.
 External stability: All payoff vectors outside the set are dominated by at least one vector in the set.

Von Neumann and Morgenstern saw the stable set as the collection of acceptable behaviours in a society: None is clearly preferred to any other, but for each unacceptable behaviour there is a preferred alternative. The definition is very general allowing the concept to be used in a wide variety of game formats.

Properties 

 A stable set may or may not exist , and if it exists it is typically not unique . Stable sets are usually difficult to find. This and other difficulties have led to the development of many other solution concepts.
 A positive fraction of cooperative games have unique stable sets consisting of the core .
 A positive fraction of cooperative games have stable sets which discriminate  players. In such sets at least  of the discriminated players are excluded .

The core 

Let  be a game.

 

In words, the core is the set of imputations under which no coalition has a value greater than the sum of its members' payoffs. Therefore, no coalition has incentive to leave the grand coalition and receive a larger payoff.

Properties 

 The core of a game may be empty (see the Bondareva–Shapley theorem). Games with non-empty cores are called balanced.
 If it is non-empty, the core does not necessarily contain a unique vector.
 The core is contained in any stable set, and if the core is stable it is the unique stable set; see  for a proof.

The core of a simple game with respect to preferences 

For simple games, there is another notion of the core, when each player is assumed to have preferences on a set  of alternatives.
Here  means that individual  prefers alternative 
Given a simple game  and a profile , a dominance relation  is defined
(i.e.) satisfying  for all .
The core  of the simple game  with respect to the profile  of preferences
is the set of alternatives undominated by 

  if and only if there is no  such that .

The Nakamura number of a simple game is the minimal number of winning coalitions with empty intersection.
Nakamura's theorem states that the core  is nonempty for all profiles  of acyclic (alternatively, transitive) preferences
A variant by Kumabe and Mihara states that the core  is nonempty for all profiles  of preferences that have a maximal element
(See Nakamura number for details.)

The strong epsilon-core 

The strong -core for some number  is the set of payoff vectors

 

Note that  may be negative, in which case it represents a bonus for leaving the grand coalition. It can also be viewed as the strong -core for the smallest value of  that makes the set non-empty .

The Shapley value 

The Shapley value is the unique payoff vector that is efficient, symmetric, and satisfies monotonicity. It was introduced by Lloyd Shapley  who showed that it is the unique payoff vector that is efficient, symmetric, additive, and assigns zero payoffs to dummy players. The Shapley value of a superadditive game is individually rational, but this is not true in general.

The kernel 

Let  be a game, and let  be an efficient payoff vector. The maximum surplus of player i over player j with respect to x is

 

the maximal amount player i can gain without the cooperation of player j by withdrawing from the grand coalition N under payoff vector x, assuming that the other players in i'''s withdrawing coalition are satisfied with their payoffs under x. The maximum surplus is a way to measure one player's bargaining power over another.

 , and
 

for every pair of players i and j. Intuitively, player i has more bargaining power than player j with respect to imputation x if , but player j is immune to player i's threats if , because he can obtain this payoff on his own. The kernel contains all imputations where no player has this bargaining power over another.

 The nucleolus 

Let  be a game, and let  be a payoff vector.

In other words, . (The ordering is called lexicographic because it mimics alphabetical ordering used to arrange words in a dictionary.)

Although the definition of the nucleolus seems abstract,  gave a more intuitive description: Starting with the least-core, record the coalitions for which the right-hand side of the inequality in the definition of  cannot be further reduced without making the set empty. Continue decreasing the right-hand side for the remaining coalitions, until it cannot be reduced without making the set empty. Record the new set of coalitions for which the inequalities hold at equality; continue decreasing the right-hand side of remaining coalitions and repeat this process as many times as necessary until all coalitions have been recorded. The resulting payoff vector is the nucleolus.

 Properties 

 Although the definition does not explicitly state it, the nucleolus is always unique.
 If the core is non-empty, the nucleolus is in the core.
 The nucleolus is always in the kernel, and since the kernel is contained in the bargaining set, it is always in the bargaining set (see  for details.)

  

Specifically, a game is convex if its characteristic function  is supermodular:

 

 

that is, "the incentives for joining a coalition increase as the coalition grows" , leading to the aforementioned snowball effect. For cost games, the inequalities are reversed, so that we say the cost game is convex if the characteristic function is submodular.

 Properties 

Convex cooperative games have many nice properties:

 Supermodularity trivially implies superadditivity.
 Convex games are totally balanced: The core of a convex game is non-empty, and since any subgame of a convex game is convex, the core of any subgame is also non-empty.
 A convex game has a unique stable set that coincides with its core.
 The Shapley value of a convex game is the center of gravity of its core.
Any vertex of the core can be constructed in this way by choosing an appropriate permutation .

 Similarities and differences with combinatorial optimization 

Submodular and supermodular set functions are also studied in combinatorial optimization. In this context, the core of a convex cost game is called the base polyhedron, because its elements generalize base properties of matroids.

However, the optimization community generally considers submodular functions to be the discrete analogues of convex functions , because the minimization of both types of functions is computationally tractable. Unfortunately, this conflicts directly with Shapley's original definition of supermodular functions as "convex".

 The relationship between cooperative game theory and firm 
Corporate strategic decisions can develop and create value through cooperative game theory. This means that cooperative game theory can become the strategic theory of the firm, and different CGT solutions can simulate different institutions.

 See also 

 Consensus decision-making
 Coordination game
 Intra-household bargaining
 Hedonic game
 Linear production game

 References 

 Further reading 

 

 

 

 

 

 . An 88-page mathematical introduction; see Chapter 8. Free online at many universities.

 

 

 Luce, R.D. and Raiffa, H. (1957) Games and Decisions: An Introduction and Critical Survey, Wiley & Sons. (see Chapter 8).
 

 Osborne, M.J. and Rubinstein, A. (1994) A Course in Game Theory'', MIT Press (see Chapters 13,14,15)
 

 

 

 

 

 

 . A comprehensive reference from a computational perspective; see Chapter 12. Downloadable free online.

 

 Yeung, David W.K. and Leon A. Petrosyan. Cooperative Stochastic Differential Games (Springer Series in Operations Research and Financial Engineering), Springer, 2006. Softcover-.
 Yeung, David W.K. and Leon A. Petrosyan. Subgame Consistent Economic Optimization: An Advanced Cooperative Dynamic Game Analysis (Static & Dynamic Game Theory: Foundations & Applications), Birkhäuser Boston; 2012.

External links 

 

 
Game theory
Mathematical and quantitative methods (economics)